Captain Fantastic is the tenth full-length studio album by German hip hop group Die Fantastischen Vier. It was released on 27 April 2018.

Release and reception
The album was published on 27 April 2018. From the album, the title "Zusammen" was released as a single. It was chosen as the official song for the 2018 FIFA World Cup by the German broadcaster Das Erste.

The album peaked at number two of the German charts, number one in Switzerland, and number three in Austria.

On the website laut.de, Captain Fantastic was rated with 3 out of 5 stars. The magazine Rolling Stone (German version) rated it with 3 out of 5.

Track listing

Charts

Weekly charts

Year-end charts

Certifications

References

Die Fantastischen Vier albums
2018 albums